Jimmy Russell was a professional rugby league footballer who played in the 1930s, 1940s, and 1950s. He played at club level for Featherstone Rovers (captain) (Heritage № 171), as an occasional goal-kicking , i.e. number 7.

Playing career
Russell made his début for Featherstone Rovers on Saturday 1 April 1939, he appears to have scored no drop-goals (or field-goals as they are currently known in Australasia), but prior to the 1974–75 season all goals, whether; conversions, penalties, or drop-goals, scored 2-points, consequently prior to this date drop-goals were often not explicitly documented, therefore '0' drop-goals may indicate drop-goals not recorded, rather than no drop-goals scored. In addition, prior to the 1949–50 season, the archaic field-goal was also still a valid means of scoring points.

Testimonial match
Russell's benefit season at Featherstone Rovers, shared with Jack Blackburn, took place during the 1951–52 season.

References

External links

Search for "Russell" at rugbyleagueproject.org
A FEATHERSTONE ROVERS BLOG: Jimmy Russell
A FEATHERSTONE ROVERS BLOG: Wilf Evans, Joe Evans, Ray ...

English rugby league players
Featherstone Rovers players
Rugby league halfbacks
Year of birth missing
Year of death missing
Place of birth missing
Place of death missing